Chapelle or La Chapelle may refer to:

Communes in France
 La Chapelle, Allier
 La Chapelle, Ardennes
 La Chapelle, Charente
 La Chapelle, Savoie
 Les Chapelles, Savoie department

Other places
 Église de la Chapelle or Kapellekerk, a church in Brussels
 Quartier de La Chapelle, a neighborhood of Paris, France
 La Chapelle (Paris Metro), a metro station in Paris, France
 Porte de la Chapelle (Paris Metro), a metro station in Paris, France
 Sainte-Chapelle, a Gothic chapel on the Île de la Cité, Paris, France
 La Chapelle, Artibonite, a commune in Artibonite department, Haiti
 La Chapelle, a commune of Plan-les-Ouates, Switzerland
 Chapelle, Glâne, a municipality of the canton of Fribourg, Switzerland
 Archbishop Chapelle High School, a high school in New Orleans, United States
 Aix-la-Chapelle or Aachen, Germany

Other uses
 La Chapelle (Church), a Baptist Evangelical multi-site church based in Montreal, Canada.
Chapelle (surname)
Chapelle Jewellery, a brand of jewellery retailer F.Hinds
de la Chapelle syndrome, a genetic disorder

See also
Chappelle (disambiguation)
Lachapelle (disambiguation)